Army One is the callsign of any United States Army aircraft carrying the president of the United States. From 1957 until 1976, this was usually an Army helicopter transporting the president. Prior to 1976, responsibility for helicopter transportation of the president was divided between the Army and the U.S. Marine Corps until the Marine Corps was given the sole responsibility of transporting the president by helicopter.

During its presidential service, the helicopter was known either as Marine One or Army One, depending on whether Marine or Army pilots were operating the craft. The helicopter, with seats for sixteen, has a seat reserved for the president and the first lady, and single, smaller seats for the two Secret Service agents who always flew with the presidential party.

Wherever the helicopter carrying a U.S. president flies, it is met on the ground by at least one soldier in full dress uniform. An Army aircraft carrying the vice president is designated Army Two.

See also
 Transportation of the president of the United States

References

External links
 https://web.archive.org/web/20160906141830/https://www.nixonlibrary.gov/themuseum/helicopter.php
 https://web.archive.org/web/20120723163133/http://www.genetboyer.com/Book.html

Presidential aircraft
Call signs
United States Army aviation
Transportation of the president of the United States